A constitutional referendum was held in Liberia on 7 May 1946. The change to the constitution was approved in the Legislature in December 1945, and would grant women the right to vote. It was approved by voters and came into force on 10 December 1946.

Constitutional change
The proposed change would be to Chapter I, article 11, section one.

A two-thirds majority in the vote was necessary for the changes to be approved.

References

Liberia
1946 in Liberia
Referendums in Liberia
Women's suffrage
Suffrage referendums
Constitutional referendums in Liberia
May 1946 events in Africa
1946 in women's history